The sixth World Cup of Softball was held in Oklahoma City, Oklahoma USA between July 21 and July 25, 2011. USA won their fifth World Cup by defeating Japan 6–4 in the Championship game.

Current standings

Preliminary round
all times CDT

Position Round
all times CDT

Teams

External links
 USA softball website

World Cup of Softball
World Cup Of Softball, 2011
World Cup of Softball